A referendum on annexation by the United States was held in the Dominican Republic on 19 February 1870. The proposal was approved by 99.93% of voters, although turnout was just 30%. However, the United States Senate rejected the annexation on 30 June 1870 with a 28–28 vote.

Background
The Dominican Republic originally became independent from Haiti in 1844 following the War of Independence. However, in 1861 the country was occupied by Spain following an inflation crisis. In 1865 the country became independent again following the Restoration War.

By 1870 the country had significant debts caused by the ongoing Six Years' War. President Buenaventura Báez planned on selling the Samaná Peninsula to the United States for $1.1 million, whilst US President Ulysses S. Grant wanted to annex the entire country. A treaty was signed between the two countries on 29 November 1869. The US would purchase the Dominican Republic for $1.5 million and would lease the Samaná Peninsula for $147,229.91 for 99 years.

On 16 February Báez ordered a referendum to be held in the form of a register. Eleven votes against were ordered so as to make the results seem plausible.

Results

See also
1868 Danish West Indies status referendum
1877 Saint Barthélemy status referendum

References

1870 referendums
1870 in the Dominican Republic
Referendums in the Dominican Republic
Dominican Republic–United States relations
Sovereignty referendums
February 1870 events
United States–Caribbean relations
History of United States expansionism
Proposed states and territories of the United States